Arichanna is a genus of moths in the family Geometridae.

Species
Arichanna albomacularia Leech, 1891
Arichanna flavomacularia Leech, 1897
Arichanna gaschkevitchii Motschulsky, 1860
Arichanna interplagata (Guenee, 1857)
Arichanna jaguararia Sato, 1999
Arichanna maculosa Wileman, 1912
Arichanna marginata Warren, 1893
Arichanna melanaria Linnaeus, 1758
Arichanna ochrivena Wileman, 1915
Arichanna olivescens Wileman&South, 1917
Arichanna picaria Wileman, 1910
Arichanna postflava Wileman, 1914
Arichanna pryeraria Leech, 1891
Arichanna sinica Wehrli, 1933
Arichanna tetrica Butler, 1878
Arichanna transfasciata Warren, 1893
Arichanna vernalis Fu & Sato, 2010

References
 Arichanna at Markku Savela's Lepidoptera and Some Other Life Forms

Boarmiini
Geometridae genera